During the Nazi occupation of Norway, German authorities deported about 768 individuals of Jewish background to concentration camps outside of Norway. Between 28 and 34 of those deported survived  their continued imprisonment (following their deportation). Because the Norwegian police and German authorities kept records of these victims, researchers have been able to compile information about the deportees.

List of Jews deported from Norway

This list is largely based on Kristian Ottosen's list, with annotations from other sources. Survivors indicated in bold.

References

Sources

 
 

People of the Holocaust
Norway
Lists of Norwegian people
Norway
The Holocaust-related lists
Norway history-related lists